Hyun-jun, also spelled Hyun-joon, Hyeon-jun, Hyeon-joon, Hyon-jun, or Hyon-joon, is a Korean masculine given name. Its meaning differs based on the hanja used to write each syllable of the name. There are 42 hanja with the reading "hyun" and 43 hanja with the reading "joon" on the South Korean government's official list of hanja which may be used in given names. It previously ranked as the eighth-most popular name for newborn boys in South Korea, with 1,636 being given the name in 2008 and 1,681 in 2009.

People with this name include:

Entertainers
Shin Hyun-joon (actor) (born 1968), South Korean actor
Nam Hyun-joon (born 1979), South Korean rapper
June (singer) (born Joo Hyun-joon, 1987), South Korean R&B singer in Japan
Hur Hyun-jun (born 2000), South Korean singer and actor, former member of The Boyz

Sportspeople
Kim Hyun-jun (1960–1999), South Korean basketball player
Son Hyun-jun (born 1972), South Korean football defender
Shin Hyun-joon (footballer) (born 1983), South Korean football midfielder
Lim Hyun-jun (born 1988), South Korean baseball player
Suk Hyun-jun (born 1991), South Korean football striker
Kim Hyeon-jun (born 1992), South Korean sport shooter
Ku Hyun-jun (born 1993), South Korean football defender
Hwang Hyeon-jun (born 1997), South Korean curler

Others
Shin Hyun-joon (general) (1915–2007), South Korean general, first commander of the Republic of Korea Marine Corps
Han Hyun-jun (born 1960), South Korean businessman, president of metalworking firm TaeguTec
Dimo Hyun Jun Kim (born 1991), South Korean theatre director and producer
Hyunjune Sebastian Seung, American physicist and neuroscientist of Korean descent

Fictional characters
Kim Hyun-jun, in 2009 South Korean television series Iris
Park Hyun-joon, in 2013 South Korean television series Pots of Gold

References

Korean masculine given names